The Khedaval  or  Khedawal is a Gujarati Brahmin community. Their traditionally served as merchants, money-lenders, pleaders, and government servants. They practice hypergamy.

According to the Brahmakṣetra Māhātmya, the Khēḍāvāḷa brahmins originated from Khēṭaka (modern Khēḍā), five miles away from Brahmakṣetra.

References

Brahmin communities of Gujarat